Robert Payne Smith (7 November 1818 – 31 March 1895) was Regius Professor of Divinity at the University of Oxford and Canon of Christ Church from 1865 until 1870, when he was appointed Dean of Canterbury by Queen Victoria on the advice of William Ewart Gladstone.

Early life and education
Payne Smith was born in Chipping Campden, Gloucestershire, on 7 November 1818, the only son and second of four children of Robert Smith, a land agent, and his wife, Esther Argles Payne, of Leggsheath, Surrey. He attended Chipping Campden Grammar School and was taught Hebrew by his eldest sister, Esther. In 1837 he obtained an exhibition at Pembroke College, Oxford to study classics. In 1841 he graduated with second-class honours. Payne Smith won the Boden Sanskrit scholarship in 1840 and the Pusey and Ellerton Hebrew scholarship in 1843.

Career
In 1843, he became a fellow of Pembroke College and was ordained a deacon, and became a priest a year later.

He gave to 1869 Bampton Lectures at Oxford and from 1870 until 1885 he was a member of the Old Testament Revision Committee (the whole duration of the committee's existence).

He provided the chapter on Genesis in Charles Ellicott's Commentary for Modern Readers and the chapter on Zechariah in The Bible Educator; and published the Thesaurus Syriacus (1868–1901, supplement added 1927), later abridged and translated into English by his daughter Jessie Margoliouth as A Compendious Syriac Dictionary (1903). He preached a series of sermons at Oxford beginning in 1858 which he later compiled into a commentary on Isaiah titled "The Authenticity and Messianic Interpretation of the Prophecies of Isaiah,"  <ref>. 

He died at his deanery on 31 March 1895 and was buried on 3 April in St Martin's churchyard, Canterbury.

References

Further reading
 Simpson, R. S. (2005) 'Smith, Robert Payne (1818–1895)', Oxford Dictionary of National Biography, Oxford University Press, 2005.

External links
 Dukhrana online searchable version of Payne Smith's Thesaurus Syriacus
 

1818 births
1895 deaths
Alumni of Pembroke College, Oxford
Syriacists
Linguists from the United Kingdom
Deans of Canterbury
People from Chipping Campden
Regius Professors of Divinity (University of Oxford)